Nicrophorus sayi is a burying beetle described by Laporte in 1840.

References

Silphidae
Beetles of North America
Beetles described in 1840